Frequency modulation synthesis (or FM synthesis) is a form of sound synthesis whereby the frequency of a waveform is changed by modulating its frequency with a modulator. The (instantaneous) frequency of an oscillator is altered in accordance with the amplitude of a modulating signal.

FM synthesis can create both harmonic and inharmonic sounds. To synthesize harmonic sounds, the modulating signal must have a harmonic relationship to the original carrier signal. As the amount of frequency modulation increases, the sound grows progressively complex. Through the use of modulators with frequencies that are non-integer multiples of the carrier signal (i.e. inharmonic), inharmonic bell-like and percussive spectra can be created.

Applications 
 However, FM synthesis can also be implemented digitally, which is more stable and became standard practice. Digital FM synthesis (equivalent to the phase modulation using the time integration of instantaneous frequency) was the basis of several musical instruments beginning as early as 1974. Yamaha built the first prototype digital synthesizer in 1974, based on FM synthesis, before commercially releasing the Yamaha GS-1 in 1980. The Synclavier I, manufactured by New England Digital Corporation beginning in 1978, included a digital FM synthesizer, using an FM synthesis algorithm licensed from Yamaha. Yamaha's groundbreaking DX7 synthesizer, released in 1983, brought FM to the forefront of synthesis in the mid-1980s.

Amusement use: FM sound chips on PC, game, and mobile phones 
FM synthesis had also become the usual setting for games and software until the mid-nineties. Through sound cards like the AdLib and Sound Blaster, IBM PCs popularized Yamaha chips like OPL2 and OPL3. OPNB was used as main basic sound generator board in SNK Neo Geo operated arcades (MVS) and home console (AES). Later variant in use for Taito Z System. The related OPN2 was used in the Fujitsu FM Towns Marty and Sega Genesis as one of its sound generator chips. Similarly, Sharp X68000 and MSX (Yamaha computer unit) also use FM-based soundchip, OPM. Throughout the 2000s, FM synthesis was also used on a wide range of phones to play ringtones and other sounds, typically in the Yamaha SMAF format.

History

Don Buchla (mid-1960s) 
Don Buchla implemented FM on his instruments in the mid-1960s, prior to Yamaha's patent. His 158, 258 and 259 dual oscillator modules had a specific FM control voltage input, and the model 208 (Music Easel) had a modulation oscillator hard-wired to allow FM as well as AM of the primary oscillator. These early applications used analog oscillators, and this capability was also followed by other modular synthesizers and portable synthesizers including Minimoog and ARP Odyssey.

John Chowning (late-1960s–1970s) 

By the mid-20th century, frequency modulation (FM), a means of carrying sound, had been understood for decades and was being used to broadcast radio transmissions. FM synthesis was developed since 1967 at Stanford University, California, by John Chowning, . His   was licensed to Japanese company Yamaha in 1973. The implementation commercialized by Yamaha (US Patent 4018121 Apr 1977 or U.S. Patent 4,018,121) , .

1970s–1980s

Expansions by Yamaha 
Yamaha's engineers began adapting Chowning's algorithm for use in a commercial digital synthesizer, adding improvements such as the "key scaling" method , though it would take several years before Yamaha released their FM digital synthesizers. In the 1970s, Yamaha were granted a number of patents, under the company's former name "Nippon Gakki Seizo Kabushiki Kaisha", evolving Chowning's work. Yamaha built the first prototype FM digital synthesizer in 1974. Yamaha eventually commercialized FM synthesis technology with the Yamaha GS-1, the first FM digital synthesizer, released in 1980.

FM synthesis was the basis of some of the early generations of digital synthesizers, most notably those from Yamaha, as well as New England Digital Corporation under license from Yamaha. Yamaha's DX7 synthesizer, released in 1983, was ubiquitous throughout the 1980s. Several other models by Yamaha provided variations and evolutions of FM synthesis during that decade.

Yamaha had patented its hardware implementation of FM in the 1970s, allowing it to nearly monopolize the market for FM technology until the mid-1990s.

Related development by Casio 
Casio developed a related form of synthesis called phase distortion synthesis, used in its CZ range of synthesizers. It had a similar (but slightly differently derived) sound quality to the DX series.

1990s

Popularization after the expiration of patent  
With the expiration of the Stanford University FM patent in 1995, digital FM synthesis can now be implemented freely by other manufacturers. The FM synthesis patent brought Stanford $20 million before it expired, making it (in 1994) "the second most lucrative licensing agreement in Stanford's history". FM today is mostly found in software-based synths such as FM8 by Native Instruments or Sytrus by Image-Line, but it has also been incorporated into the synthesis repertoire of some modern digital synthesizers, usually coexisting as an option alongside other methods of synthesis such as subtractive, sample-based synthesis, additive synthesis, and other techniques. The degree of complexity of the FM in such hardware synths may vary from simple 2-operator FM, to the highly flexible 6-operator engines of the Korg Kronos and Alesis Fusion, to creation of FM in extensively modular engines such as those in the latest synthesisers by Kurzweil Music Systems.

Realtime Convolution & Modulation (AFM + Sample) and Formant Shaping Synthesis  
New hardware synths specifically marketed for their FM capabilities disappeared from the market after the release of the Yamaha SY99 and FS1R, and even those marketed their highly powerful FM abilities as counterparts to sample-based synthesis and formant synthesis respectively.   

Combining sets of 8 FM operators with multi-spectral wave forms began in 1999 by Yamaha in the FS1R.  The FS1R had 16 operators, 8 standard FM operators and 8 additional operators that used a noise source rather than an oscillator as its sound source.  By adding in tuneable noise sources the FS1R could model the sounds produced in the human voice and in a wind instrument, along with making percussion instrument sounds. The FS1R also contained an additional wave form called the Formant wave form.  Formants can be used to model resonating body instrument sounds like the cello, violin, acoustic guitar, bassoon, English horn, or human voice. Formants can even be found in the harmonic spectrum of several brass instruments.

2000s–present

Variable Phase Modulation, FM-X Synthesis, Altered FM, etc 

In 2016, Korg released the Korg Volca FM, a, 3-voice, 6 operators FM iteration of the Korg Volca series of compact, affordable desktop modules, and Yamaha released the Montage, which combines a 128-voice sample-based engine with a 128-voice FM engine. This iteration of FM is called FM-X, and features 8 operators; each operator has a choice of several basic wave forms, but each wave form has several parameters to adjust its spectrum. The Yamaha Montage was followed by the more affordable Yamaha MODX in 2018, with 64-voice, 8 operators FM-X architecture in addition to a 128-voice sample-based engine. Elektron in 2018 launched the Digitone, an 8-voice, 4 operators FM synth featuring Elektron's renowned sequence engine.

FM-X synthesis was introduced with the Yamaha Montage synthesizers in 2016.  FM-X uses 8 operators. Each FM-X operator has a set of multi-spectral wave forms to choose from, which means each FM-X operator can be equivalent to a stack of 3 or 4 DX7 FM operators.  The list of selectable wave forms includes sine waves, the All1 and All2 wave forms, the Odd1 and Odd2 wave forms, and the Res1 and Res2 wave forms. The sine wave selection works the same as the DX7 wave forms.  The All1 and All2 wave forms are a saw-tooth wave form.  The Odd1 and Odd2 wave forms are pulse or square waves.  These two types of wave forms can be used to model the basic harmonic peaks in the bottom of the harmonic spectrum of most instruments.  The Res1 and Res2 wave forms move the spectral peak to a specific harmonic and can be used to model either triangular or rounded groups of harmonics further up in the spectrum of an instrument.  Combining an All1 or Odd1 wave form with multiple Res1 (or Res2) wave forms (and adjusting their amplitudes) can model the harmonic spectrum of an instrument or sound.

Spectral analysis 
There are multiple variations of FM synthesis, including:
Various operator arrangements (known as "FM Algorithms" in Yamaha terminology)
2 operators
Serial FM (multiple stages)
Parallel FM (multiple modulators, multiple-carriers),
Mix of them
Various waveform of operators
Sinusoidal waveform
Other waveform
Additional modulation
Linear FM
Exponential FM (preceded by the anti-logarithm conversion for CV/oct. interface of analog synthesizers)
Oscillator sync with FM
etc.

As the basic of these variations, we analyze the spectrum of 2 operators (linear FM synthesis using two sinusoidal operators) on the following.

2 operators 
The spectrum generated by FM synthesis with one modulator is expressed as follows:

For modulation signal , the carrier signal is:

where  are angular frequencies of carrier and modulator,  is frequency modulation index, and amplitudes  is -th Bessel function of first kind, respectively.

See also
Additive synthesis
Chiptune
Digital synthesizer
Electronic music
Sound card
Sound chip
Video game music

References

Footnotes

Citations

Bibliography

External links 
 An Introduction To FM, by Bill Schottstaedt
 FM tutorial
 Synth Secrets, Part 12: An Introduction To Frequency Modulation, by Gordon Reid
 Synth Secrets, Part 13: More On Frequency Modulation, by Gordon Reid
 Paul Wiffens Synth School: Part 3
 F.M. Synthesis including complex operator analysis mirror site of F.M. Synthesis, 2019

Sound synthesis types